In December 2017, NASA released a mission concept involving the launch of an interstellar probe to search for signs of life on planets orbiting stars in and around the Alpha Centauri system. The mission remains a concept, and as such, has no name or allocated funding.

A preliminary mission outline suggests the use of solar sails propelled by high energy lasers to increase propulsion. The proposed launch would be on the 100th anniversary of the Apollo 11 mission.
The spacecraft will reach Alpha Centauri by the year 2113, 44 years after its launch travelling at 10% of the speed of light.

See also
 Breakthrough Starshot
 Starlight (interstellar probe)
 Project Longshot

References

Hypothetical spacecraft
Proposed NASA space probes
Interstellar travel
2069 in science
Alpha Centauri
Projects established in 2017
Centennial anniversaries